A series of ICC World Cricket League tournaments and the 2018 Cricket World Cup Qualifier were played between 2012 and 2018 and formed part of the Cricket World Cup qualification process for the 2019 Cricket World Cup. It was the third time the World Cricket League was used for World Cup qualification. At the conclusion of the previous cycle, the competition was composed of eight divisions but in 2014, ICC reduced Division 7 and Division 8. In addition, a series of qualifying regional tournaments were played.

Background 
On 28 January 2015, the ICC announced that the leading two associate sides, Ireland and Afghanistan, would be promoted to the ICC ODI Championship for the period until the 2019 World Cup. This promotion guaranteed both associate sides entry to the final Cricket World Cup qualifier, and an opportunity to qualify directly through the ODI championship.

As a consequence, both teams were removed from the World Cricket League one-day programme, and Kenya and Nepal, who had missed out on promotion to World Cricket League Championship days before, were promoted to the Championship.

List of tournaments

Tournament results

References 

 
2012-18